Mohammad Saukat (born 7 November 1997) is an Indian footballer who plays as a defensive midfielder for Nepal A- Division League club Brigade Boys Club.

Club career

Early years
Born in Malerkotla, Punjab, Saukat joined Pune FC Academy as a trainee, his performances in the Junior I-League caught the eyes of Mohun Bagan who made no hesitations in signing him in their youth rank. He was made the Captain of the U-19 Team in the 2013-14 season.

Fateh Hyderabad A.F.C.
Saukat's first experience of senior football was granted to him by the newly assigned Fateh Hyderabad A.F.C. side in the 2015–16 I-League 2nd Division. Despite the team not making it to the final round, Saukat's performances attracted the recruiters, he was then offered a contract by Mohammedan Sporting Club for the following season.

Mohammedan Sporting Club
For the 2016, Kolkata League, Saukat was signed as a player by Mohammedan Sporting Club. He played four matches in the League helping the team to be the Runners' Up.

Gokulam Kerala F.C.
Saukat's first taste in the I-League was provided by the debutant club from Kerala, Gokulam Kerala FC. He just made one appearance in the I-League and was one of the shortlisted players in the ISL Draft, 2017.

Tollygunge Agragami FC
In July, 2018, Saukat signed for the Sahara Kolkata Premier League club Tollygunge Agragami where he played all their matches in the League.

Brigade Boys Club
In 2019, he moved to Nepal and signed with Martyr's Memorial A-Division League outfit Brigade Boys Club on a season-long deal.

See also
 List of Indian football players in foreign leagues

References

External links

1997 births
Living people
Footballers from Punjab, India
Association football midfielders
Indian footballers
Gokulam Kerala FC players
Expatriate footballers in Nepal
Tollygunge Agragami FC players